Aghlal is a commune in northwestern Algeria.

References 

Communes of Aïn Témouchent Province